Jeanne Mance (1606–1673), a French nurse who was a founding figure of New France and Montreal, Quebec, Canada

Jeanne Mance may also refer to:

Places
 Jeanne-Mance, a district of Plateau-Mont-Royal, Montreal, Quebec, Canada
 Jeanne-Mance Street, a north-south street in Downtown Montreal, Montreal, Quebec, Canada
 Jeanne-Mance Park, an urban park bordering Mount Royal Park, in Plateau-Mont-Royal, Montreal, Quebec, Canada
 Jeanne Mance Monument, a memorial at Hotel-Dieu Hospital in Plateau-Mont-Royal, Montreal, Quebec, Canada
 Habitations Jeanne-Mance, Ville-Marie, Montreal, Quebec, Canada; an "urban project"; the only mid-century low-income urban renewal mass habitation project in Montreal
 Jeanne-Mance (provincial electoral district), Saint-Leonard, Montreal Island, Quebec, Canada; a former riding
 Montréal–Jeanne-Mance, Montreal, Quebec, Canada; a former provincial electoral district
 Jeanne-Mance–Viger, Montreal, Quebec, Canada; a provincial electoral district

Other uses
 Jeanne-Mance Delisle (born 1941), a Canadian writer

See also

 
 Jeanne (disambiguation)
 Mance (disambiguation)